The 1880 college football season had no clear-cut champion, with the Official NCAA Division I Football Records Book listing Princeton and Yale as having been selected national champions. On April 9, college football was first played in the state of Kentucky when Kentucky University defeated Centre 13–0 at Stoll Field. It was one of the first in the South.

Conference standings

References